Sandy Hook Pilots are licensed maritime pilots that are members of the Sandy Hook Pilots Association for the Port of New York and New Jersey, the Hudson River, and Long Island Sound. Sandy Hook pilots guide oceangoing vessels, passenger liners, freighters, and tankers in and out of the harbor. The peninsulas of Sandy Hook, and Rockaway in Lower New York Bay define the southern entrance to the port at the Atlantic Ocean.

History

The Sandy Hook pilots have been piloting ships in the New York Harbor for over 300 years and can be traced back to 1694. The group of men and women ensure safe passage for ships going through The Narrows, which is one of the most important entrances into the harbors of the Port of New York and New Jersey.

Lying below the surface of the bay and extending from the tip of Sandy Hook to the south shore of Long Island is a series of shoals that separate New York–New Jersey Harbor Estuary from the deeper waters of the Atlantic; known as the Bar of Sandy Hook. For over three centuries the mariners tasked with guiding the ships across this bar have been known as Sandy Hook pilots.

Earliest pilots

As the port of New York-New Jersey grew and the ships evolved so did the role of the pilot and the craft with which he used to ply his trade. The earliest pilots were employed as explorers, tasked with sounding and surveying the harbors for their respective European governments. Henry Hudson used his pijl lood for three days from the deck of the Halve Maen sounding and charting the Lower Bay. The channel he found lay close to the spit of land called Sant Hoek; known today as Sandy Hook. The English term pilot comes from the two Dutch words pijl (pole) and lood (lead). The early colonist of Manhattan Island, kept a whaleboat at Sandy Hook, ready to place a pilot aboard incoming vessels.

After two major shipwrecks in 1836, it became apparent that service for vessels entering and departing the port was necessary. A committee of merchants and citizens organized a small group of local seamen to assist the ship masters coming into the port.

Local profession

The sailor on the great Seal of New York City holds in his hand the traditional tool of the pilot; the lead. This is a testament to the importance of the craft to early New Yorkers. Over the seventeenth century as populations increased, pilotage became a more local profession. The need for local knowledge of tides, currents, shoals, and navigational hazards prompted this change. On March 9, 1694 legislation passed by the Colony of New York appointed the first local mariners as Sandy Hook pilots.

Board of Wardens

Throughout the colonial period pilotage continued to develop. In 1718 competition began to be recognized as a problem; legislation was enacted to punish those who would pose as a pilot by fines or seizure of property. By 1763 the Board of Wardens was created to regulate and license pilots and to strengthen compulsory pilotage established by early acts. When the first American president, George Washington, arrived in Elizabeth, New Jersey he boarded a stately ceremonial barge rowed by thirteen pilots in white uniforms to the Battery for his inauguration.

Pilotage law	

In 1784 the New York legislature recognized and strengthened state pilotage law. Under this legislation Zachary Rusler became the first New York State-licensed Sandy Hook Pilot. His license was signed by  Governor George Clinton. When war came again with Great Britain the New York pilots distinguished themselves bravely by running the blockade and bringing news of war to American vessels in European ports as far as Gothenburg and Archangel. This service allowed American vessels valuable time to escape to neutral ports for safety. For much of the war commerce was in ruins and many pilots, whose exploits fill volumes, took to privateering, establishing a tradition of patriotism still alive today.

First New Jersey Sandy Hook pilot

In the subsequent decades the Board of Wardens became part of the political machine and pilot appointments were given out as political favors. Many unqualified men crowded the once noble ranks of the New York pilots. It took tragedy to spur change. It came in December 1836 with the wreck of two immigrant ships: the "Mexico" and the "Bristol". During the winter gale both ships came upon the Hook and signaled for pilots. No pilots responded, and the ships wrecked with the loss of the lives of 215 men, women and children. "Most of the victims aboard the Bristol and the Mexico were immigrants—mostly poor Irish Catholics—and sailors, many of whom were black." The public was outraged. The state of New Jersey took action and licensed Theophilus Beebe, an owner of a  Fulton Market  fishing smack, as the first New Jersey Sandy Hook Pilot for the ports of Perth Amboy, Newark, and New York Bay. For the first time there was competition between the two states.

In 1837 the Board of Wardens was replaced by the Board of Pilot Commissioners charged with licensing and regulating pilotage. The new pilot commission could not overcome the shortcomings of its predecessor and by 1845 legislators repealed all laws governing pilotage.  Complicated politics at both the national and state level prompted industry to take matters into their own hands and underwriters and ship-owners collectively began licensing pilots. There were three different groups of pilots competing for work on the bar. 

In 1845, an unofficial Pilot Commission was established with two representatives from the Marine Underwriters and three from the Chamber of Commerce. Pilot boats working under the Underwriters' Commission took on licensed pilots that proved to be more insurable because of their strict rules and regulations. By 1846, the Underwriters' Commission became the official body for governing the pilot service. By 1853 the state of New York made it official, making the members of the Board of Underwriters officials of the state, and recognized the board as the official Board of Pilot Commissioners for the State of New York. Today the board is called the Board of Commissioners of Pilots of the State of New York.

On December 23, 1903, Frank P. Van Pelt was secretary and superintendent of the New York and New Jersey Sandy Hook Pilots Association. By August 24, 1922, he became President of the Pilots' Association and chairman of the executive committee of the New York and New Jersey Pilots' Associations.

Competition

This era of competition coincided with the port of New York’s ascension to the preeminent U.S port. The Erie Canal was completed opening the Northwest Territories, the arrival of the Liverpool  Packet boats, and the lack of an ice-free deep water competitive port for one hundred miles in either direction, all led to the consolidation and expansion of the Port of New York. This fierce competition led to the development of the pilot schooner, one of the fastest crafts of her day, since the pilots were forced to race for ships. The pilots perfected their seamanship and were masters of their craft. The pilot vessels of this era brought notoriety and fame to their owners. When Charles Wilkes left on the U.S. Exploring Expedition in 1838 two of the five ships of the fleet were New York pilot boats. Captain Dick Brown Master of the Mary Taylor took time away from the service to race the schooner  America to victory against the British at Cowes in 1851. In 1846 the pilot boat Romer raced to Great Britain with news of a treaty over the Oregon Territories.

New York levied an extra fee for any vessel boarded outside 15 miles of the Hook. This drove the pilots further offshore. Competition was so great that pilot vessels found themselves cruising out to the  Sable Banks to the east and  Hatteras to the south. Pilots would be aboard a ship for a thousand miles only to work the last twenty. This system exposed their small craft to all the fury of the Atlantic and the casualties began to mount. Due to the nature of their work and proximity to the Bar, many pilots distinguished themselves with acts of heroism and rescue. One was Captain Thomas Freeborne of the pilot boat  Blossom. A member of the old guard of New York pilots, in a February gale in 1856 he called on the barque John Minturn. Seeing that he was a New Yorker, the master refused his service preferring a Jersey man, but when no other pilot called and the sea worsened, the master relented and boarded the pilot. Only now the situation was in extremis and the barque lay towards the lee shore of New Jersey. The pilot did what he could to soften the blow and went aground. He then selflessly gave his clothing to the master’s wife and child exposing himself to the cold. He was found frozen to death and later interred at the Green-Wood Cemetery where a large monument marks his grave.

Many of the Sandy Hook men volunteered for naval service during the American Civil War. They helped the federal government in blockading about 1,500 miles of coast. Some of the pilots were so skilled that they won tribute from the Federal naval commandants. On September 29, 1864, the William Bell, No. 24 ventured too far out to sea and was captured and burned by the Confederate raiding steamer the CSS Tallahassee.

Steamships
With the arrival of steam fewer and fewer ship Masters were willing to slow and take pilots offshore. To them scheduling was everything and the competition for passengers meant you had to make the passage as fast as possible. This economic pressure combined with the staggering loss of life to the service during the Great Blizzard of 1888 spelled the end of the era of competition.  By 1895 both states had combined to form the two Associations in existence today. Assets were liquefied and the first steam powered pilot vessel named New York went into service.  The era of the Association brought better wages, a regular balanced work rotation, and more structured training. Many surnames of current pilots descend from this time.  This era coincided with the deepening of the East Bank Channel into what is now called Ambrose Channel and the development of the petroleum industry in New Jersey that opened the Arthur Kill between Elizabeth and  Perth Amboy and made the circumnavigation of Staten Island possible. Additionally this was the time of the great immigration. The leviathans could now enter the port and for the countless would-be Americans who crossed thousands of miles of ocean the first American many would see was a Sandy Hook Pilot.

As the ocean going ships traded their sails for steam, so did the pilots. Later they traded their oars and yawls for motorboats. They saw their port grow for a time to the largest in the world. They also serviced many times the normal number of ships during the two World Wars while serving as Coast Guardsman.  They continue to make their vessels available in times of emergencies. The twentieth century saw the pilots engaged in many rescue efforts including the Morro Castle and the Bronx Queen. The twenty first century dawned with the attacks of September 11, 2001. There was an impromptu marine evacuation of lower Manhattan, the likes of which the world had not seen since the battle of Dunkirk, and for which the pilots, boats, and crews played no small part. 
	
Pilots continue to embrace the newest technologies available to provide the safest and most efficient service for their port.

Today

The Sandy Hook Pilot base is located on Staten Island, New York. Pilot stations are maintained at the entrance to the Port of New York and New Jersey by Ambrose Light, City Island by Long Island Sound, and Yonkers for the Hudson River."  Their fleet includes more than a dozen modern vessels.

The Board of Commissioners of Pilots is a public agency, created by the New York State Legislature, to provide for the selection, training, licensing, and regulation of pilots, who navigate oceangoing vessels, which operate on New York State waters and Connecticut and New Jersey waters.

See also
Joseph Henderson v. United States

References

External links
  
 
 NY & NJ Holds Waterfront Conference 2002 Michael Bloomberg, Mayor of the City of New York, on behalf of the crews of the tugboats that played life-saving and evacuation roles on September 11, 2001 presented "Hero of the Harbor" awards.

  

Maritime pilotage organizations
Port of New York and New Jersey
Water transportation in New York City
Water transportation in New Jersey